Tsevi E. Tal (16 January 1927 – 22 June 2021) was a Polish-born Israeli judge. After being Israeli district court judge (1978–1994) he became Justice of the Supreme Court of Israel (1994–1997).

He was the head of the Tal Committee on exemptions from military service for ultra-Orthodox Jews (1999-2000).

Tal died on 22 June 2021, aged 94.

References

20th-century Israeli judges
1927 births
2021 deaths
Place of birth missing
Place of death missing
Polish emigrants to Israel
Judges of the Supreme Court of Israel